Burachalu (also Romanized as Būrāchālū; also known as Būrā Chāllū and Būrā Chālū) is a village in Jazireh Rural District, Ilkhchi District, Osku County, East Azerbaijan Province, Iran. At the 2006 census, its population was 159, in 47 families.

References 

Populated places in Osku County